Grainger Town is the historic commercial centre of Newcastle upon Tyne, England. Almost all of Grainger Town is in Newcastle's Central Conservation Area, one of the first designated in England. The area includes a mediaeval 13th-century Dominican friary, pieces of the historic Town Walls, and many fine Georgian and Victorian buildings.  

The area is named after Richard Grainger, a developer  who built several classical streets between 1824 and 1841, including Grey Street, Grainger Street, and Clayton Street. Richard Grainger was said to “have found Newcastle of bricks and timber and left it in stone.”  

Some of Newcastle's finest buildings are in Grainger Town, including Grainger Market and Theatre Royal. These buildings are predominantly four stories, with vertical dormers, domes, turrets, and spikes. The architecture is dubbed “Tyneside Classical.” Grainger Town has 450 buildings, and 244 are listed (29 at grade I and 49 at grade II*). The majority of buildings remain in private ownership. 

Sir Nikolaus Pevsner described Grey Street as “one of the finest streets in England.” The area around it and Grey's Monument is expanding quickly, with high-quality shopping, including designer fashions and jewelry. The Central Exchange, containing the Edwardian Central Arcade, is located in Grainger Town.

Grey Street

Grainger built Grey Street in the 1830s. Several architects, including John Dobson, were involved. The street’s entire western side was designed by two architects from Grainger's office, John Wardle and George Walker. Grey Street contains the Theatre Royal designed by John and Benjamin Green, the southern entrance to Monument Metro station, and the Central Arcade. BBC Radio 4 listeners voted it “Best street in the UK” in 2010.

Initially named Upper Dean Street, Grey Street runs south from Grey's Monument, following the route of the Lorke or Lort Burn, which formerly flowed openly into the Tyne and is now enclosed, curving slowly to the east and descending to the river. It ends after the Mosley Street junction, where Dean Street, constructed in 1749, begins. 

Sir John Betjeman said:

Grainger Market

Grainger Market is a Grade I listed covered market, constructed as part of the 19th-century urban renewal replacing markets on the site of Grey Street. Designed by John Dobson, it opened in 1835. The market has two sections: The Eastern, which was a meat market laid out in a series of aisles; and the Western, which was a vegetable market with a large open hall. The vegetable market's roof was in ill-repair by 1898, and the current roof was installed in 1901. While the principal uses of the market have since changed, it still houses a number of butchers' stalls.

The market is home to a small branch of Marks & Spencer, a market stall known as Marks and Spencer's Original Penny Bazaar.

Decay
In the 1960s and 1970s, parts of Grainger Town, constituting about a quarter of Grainger's original scheme, were demolished to make way for projects such as the Eldon Square Shopping Centre. 

In the 1980s and early 1990s, the area was overtaken by new retail and commercial centres. 

By the early 1990s, Richard Grainger's legacy was in poor shape, as shops and offices moved to other locations. The area’s residential population fell rapidly to 1,200. Around  was vacant, and the area exhibited all the classic symptoms of urban decay. Structural problems were evident, with 47% of its 244 listed buildings classed as being “at risk” and 29% as “vulnerable.” There were calls for listed properties and whole streets to be razed, and investor confidence was low.

Grainger Town project

Project information

In 1993, a property development and environmental enhancement programme was started by Newcastle City Council and English Heritage. In 1996, Newcastle City Council, English Heritage and English Partnerships commissioned EDAW to produce a regeneration strategy for Grainger Town, intended to align the town with other major European regional capitals. The proposed project commenced in April 1997 and ended in March 2003, attracting over £174 million in funding, including £146 million from the private sector, which exceeded the estimated £74 million budget.

Major achievements

Union Rooms
JD Wetherspoons, a U.K. pub chain, spent 13 months restoring the French Renaissance style of the former Union Club opposite Newcastle station. When completed, the pub was renamed The Union Rooms.

33-41 Grey Street 
The building was built in 1835 by Grainger for the Bank of England. The Grade II* listed building was restored with the help of a grant in 1997. Following extensive repairs, the building hosts a bar on the ground floor, and offices above.

The Gate

Land Securities developed a new  retail and leisure complex, which opened in 2002. The Gate is a covered multi-level centre, with a glass façade, housing a multiplex cinema, a sky bar with views over the city, restaurants and a casino.

Other achievements

 1506 jobs created as well as a further 800 in Grainger Town from the increased confidence in the area.
 286 new businesses.
 of new and/or improved commercial floorspace.
 121 buildings, many of them listed properties and classified as 'buildings at risk', restored for use.
 Grey's Monument repaired and cleaned.
 289 flats and apartments completed with many located within the Grainger Street and Clayton Street areas.
 Westgate House, which was an eleven-storey office block, was acquired by ONE North East and demolished between late 2006 and early 2007.

References

External links
Newcastle City Council/Grainger Town 
Case study on Grainger Town by the Commission for Architecture and the Built Environment
Document on the Grainger Town project
Newcastle City Councils info on Grainger Town project

Districts of Newcastle upon Tyne